The ASEAN Smart Cities Network (ASCN) is a collaborative platform which aims to unify smart city development efforts across ASEAN by facilitating cooperation on smart city development, creating bankable projects in conjunction with the private sector, and securing funding and support from ASEAN's external partners. It was launched at the 32nd ASEAN Summit as a key deliverable of Singapore's ASEAN Chairmanship 2018. The Inaugural Meeting of the ASCN took place on 8 July 2018.

Background 
The ASCN is a response to the trend of the region's rapid urbanization. ASEAN's growth has primarily been driven by metropolises; 90 million more people are expected to reside in urban areas by 2030; "middleweight" cities of between 200,000 and 2 million residents forecast to drive 40% of the region's growth. The ASCN aims to help ASEAN Member States harness technological and digital solutions and thus improve the lives of people across the urban-rural continuum.

ASCN Cities 
A list of the 26 Pilot Cities that have been nominated by the respective ASEAN Member States is as follows:

- Bandar Seri Begawan
- Battambang
- Phnom Penh
- Siem Reap
- Makassar
- Banyuwangi
- Jakarta
- Luang Prabang
- Vientiane
- Johor Bahru
- Kuala Lumpur
- Kota Kinabalu
- Kuching
- Naypyidaw
- Mandalay
- Yangon
- Cebu City
- Davao City
- Manila
- Singapore
- Bangkok
- Chonburi
- Phuket
- Da Nang
- Hanoi
- Ho Chi Minh City

The Smart City Action Plans and Priority Projects developed by the 26 Pilot Cities can be found here

Representation 
Each ASEAN Member State nominates a National Representative to the Network. In addition, each city also nominates a Chief Smart City Officer (CSCO). The status of a CSCO is equivalent to that of a Chief Urban Planner or Chief Resilience Officer.  CSCO's role is to attend the annual meeting, craft 
his or her respective city’s action plan and discuss the ASEAN Smart Cities Framework. There is thus representation at both the national and municipal levels. The table below lists the CSCOs who are each city's main point of contact with the Network.

Support and partnerships  

In March 2018, Australia announced an A$30 million fund to support smart city development in ASEAN.

In July 2018, five agreements were signed during the Opening Ceremony of the Inaugural ASCN Meeting. Among them was an agreement between the United Nations Development Program (UNDP) and the Japan External Trade Organization (JETRO) which expressed support for the ASCN in the context of promoting sustainable development in the Asia Pacific. An agreement was also signed between the Amata Smart City Corporation Chonburi and the Yokohama Urban Solutions Alliance.

References 

ASEAN
Economic geography
Sustainable urban planning
Urban studies and planning terminology
Smart cities